Hudiksvall Municipality (Hudiksvalls kommun) is one of Sweden's 290 municipalities, situated  in Gävleborg County, east central Sweden. Its seat is in the city Hudiksvall.

The present municipality was formed in 1971 when the City of Hudiksvall was amalgamated with four surrounding rural municipalities. Minor amalgamations had also taken place in 1952 and 1965, reducing the number of local government entities in the area.

Geography 
Distance to large towns: Stockholm , Gävle , Sundsvall .

Localities 
Figures as of 2000, from Statistics Sweden

Hudiksvall 15 325 (2002)
Iggesund, 3444  
Delsbo, 2284 
Enånger, 724  
Friggesund, 599
Sörforsa, 1540

Demographics
This is a demographic table based on Hudiksvall Municipality's electoral districts in the 2022 Swedish general election sourced from SVT's election platform, in turn taken from SCB official statistics.

Residents include everyone registered as living in the district, regardless of age or citizenship status. Valid voters indicate Swedish citizens above the age of 18 who therefore can vote in general elections. Left vote and right vote indicate the result between the two major blocs in said district in the 2022 general election. Employment indicates the share of people between the ages of 20 and 64 who are working taxpayers. Foreign background denotes residents either born abroad or with two parents born outside of Sweden. Median income is the received monthly income through either employment, capital gains or social grants for the median adult above 20, also including pensioners in Swedish kronor. College graduates indicates any degree accumulated after high school.

In total there were 37,708 inhabitants with 29,561 Swedish citizen adults eligible to vote. The political demographics were 55.3 % for the left bloc and 43.5 % for the right bloc.

Climate

Economy 
The largest employer is the municipality and the county council, where around 38% of the work force have its work place.

The largest private employer is the paper product company Holmen where about 10% of the work force work.

In the old history, the industry was dominated by fishing. In the 19th century the forest industry came to dominate, further enhanced by the improved transportations which the rail roads provided in the second half of that century. Although in decline during the 20th century, half of the municipal industry is still based around forest industry.

Employees per sectors: 
 Pulp, paper, and paper goods: 29% 
 Machine technical industry: 20%
 Electronics 19%
 Metal products: 8% 
 Wood products 7%.

The electronics industry is dominated by Ericsson Network Technologies making optical and copper wires for telecommunication systems. (Sources: ,Holmen.com)

Transportation 

Hudiksvall is accessible via the European route E4 highway, and the East Coast Railway (Ostkustbanan).

References

External links 

Hudiksvall - Official site

Municipalities of Gävleborg County